In re Primus, 436 U.S. 412 (1978), was a United States Supreme Court case in which the Court held that solicitation of prospective litigants by nonprofit organizations that engage in litigation as a form of political expression and political association constitutes expressive and associational conduct entitled to First Amendment protection.

Background 
Primus was an attorney for the South Carolina affiliate of the ACLU.  South Carolina had a policy of sterilizing certain women as a condition of receiving welfare.  Primus sent letters to women who had been thus sterilized, offering the legal assistance of the ACLU.   The South Carolina's Supreme Court disciplinary board reprimanded Primus for violating South Carolina bar rules against soliciting business.  The  South Carolina Supreme Court approved the discipline.   Primus appealed to the U.S. Supreme Court.

Opinion of the Court 
The U.S. Supreme Court overturned the discipline, ruling that solicitation of prospective litigants by nonprofit organizations that engage in litigation as a form of political expression and political association constitutes expressive and associational conduct entitled to First Amendment protection.

The opinion in In re Primus was released the same day as another First Amendment case relating to attorney solicitation Ohralik v. Ohio State Bar Ass’n, 436 U.S. 447 (1978), which upheld a ban on attorney solicitation of accident victims within 30 days of the incident. The holdings were distinguished on account of the political expression and association elements present in Primus and absent in Ohralik.

See also 
 NAACP v. Button, 
 Ambulance chasing

References

External links
 
 

1978 in United States case law
American Civil Liberties Union litigation
United States Free Speech Clause case law
United States professional responsibility case law
United States Supreme Court cases
United States Supreme Court cases of the Burger Court
United States reproductive rights case law